San Dimas is an under construction light rail station in the Los Angeles Metro Rail system. The station is located on San Dimas Avenue near its intersection with Bonita Avenue along the Pasadena Subdivision right of way in San Dimas, California. It will be served by the A Line. It is currently under construction as part of the Foothill Extension and is slated to open in 2025.

A city-owned 300-space park and ride facility is located adjacent to the facility at 205 S San Dimas Avenue.

Bus connections
 Foothill Transit: 492, 499  to Los Angeles Union Station

References

External links
San Dimas station – Metro Gold Line Foothill Extension Construction Authority

Future Los Angeles Metro Rail stations
Railway stations scheduled to open in 2025
San Dimas, California